Baldur is an unincorporated community recognized as a local urban district in the Canadian province of Manitoba, located in the Rural Municipality of Argyle. Baldur is the largest community of the municipality, which is in southwestern Manitoba between Brandon and Portage la Prairie. The community is named after the Norse god Baldur.

History
The community was founded in 1890 with the coming of the railway. Its name reflects the Icelandic heritage of the people in the community.

Demographics 

Notable people
 It is the birthplace of Hockey Hall of Famer Tom Johnson
 It is the birthplace of award-winning author and naturalist Bill Stilwell
 It was where the Icelandic businessman Hallgrímur Fr. Hallgrímsson (1905–84) went to high school.

Climate

See also 
List of communities in Manitoba
List of regions of Manitoba

References

External links

 Town of Baldur

Designated places in Manitoba
Local urban districts in Manitoba
Places in Canada settled by Icelanders